Isopropyl palmitate is the ester of isopropyl alcohol and palmitic acid. It is an emollient, moisturizer, thickening agent, and anti-static agent . The chemical formula is CH3(CH2)14COOCH(CH3)2.

References

Cosmetics chemicals
Isopropyl esters
Lipids
Palmitate esters